George Karlaftis (born 3 April 2001) is a Greek-born professional American football defensive end for the Kansas City Chiefs of the National Football League (NFL). He was born in Athens and grew up as a multi-sport athlete playing football, track and field, basketball, and water polo, the latter of which he played with the Greek national team.

Karlaftis and his family moved to the United States when he was 13. He played college football at Purdue, where he won all-Big Ten honors before being drafted by the Chiefs in the first round of the 2022 NFL Draft.

Early years
Karlaftis was born in Athens, Greece. His father Μathiós "Matthew" Karlaftis grew up as an all-around athlete in Greece and later earned a degree in civil engineering at the University of Miami before pursuing a doctorate at Purdue University. His mother Amy, who had grown up near Purdue in West Lafayette, Indiana, met Matthew while she was a freshman. After marrying, they settled in Athens. While Amy spoke English to the couple's four children at home, they were otherwise brought up in Greek culture.

In his early years in Athens, he played water polo as a goalkeeper in the youth ranks of Panathinaikos, the Greek team of which he is also an avid supporter.

Matthew died of a heart attack in 2014 while on the island of Kos where he was to deliver a speech at an engineering conference there. Following his death, Amy and her children moved back to West Lafayette, where George Karlaftis began attending West Lafayette High School. He was enlisted in the school's football team and had 41 sacks during his high school career. He also competed in track and field for the school, including winning back-to-back state championships in shot put. He played in the 2019 U.S. Army All-American Game, where he was named the Defensive Player of the Year. He graduated early from high school and enrolled at Purdue in January 2019.

College career
As a true freshman at Purdue in 2019, Karlaftis started all 12 games, recording 54 tackles and 7.5 sacks. He only played in three games as a sophomore in 2020 due to a positive COVID-19 result, finishing the year with four tackles and two sacks. Karlaftis declared for the 2022 NFL Draft following the 2021 season in which he recorded 4.5 sacks.

Professional career

Karlaftis was drafted by the Kansas City Chiefs in the first round (30th overall) of the 2022 NFL Draft. Karlaftis ended his rookie season with 33 tackle, 6 tackles and 2 fumble recoveries. The Chiefs reached Super Bowl LVII where they defeated the Philadelphia Eagles 38–35 with Karlaftis recording 2 tackles in the game.

NFL career statistics

Personal life
Karlaftis was once a youth member of the Greece men's national water polo team. His father, Matthew, was a javelin thrower for the University of Miami's track and field team and also tried playing on their football team before suffering a severe skull injury during his first practice with them. His brother, Yanni, won a youth world championship in judo at 11 and joined the Boilermakers as an outside linebacker in 2021.

Karlaftis is a Christian.

References

External links
 Kansas City Chiefs bio
Purdue Boilermakers bio

2001 births
Living people
Sportspeople from Athens
People from West Lafayette, Indiana
Players of American football from Indiana
American football defensive ends
Purdue Boilermakers football players
Greek male water polo players
Greek players of American football
Greek male shot putters
Track and field athletes from Indiana
All-American college football players
Kansas City Chiefs players